Pietro de' Marchesi (died 1544) was a Roman Catholic prelate who served as Bishop of Massa Lubrense (1521–1544).

Career
On 12 April 1521, Marchesi was appointed during the papacy of Pope Leo X as Bishop of Massa Lubrense. He served as Bishop of Massa Lubrense until his death in 1544.

References

External links and additional sources
 (for Chronology of Bishops) 
 (for Chronology of Bishops) 

1544 deaths
16th-century Italian Roman Catholic bishops
Bishops appointed by Pope Leo X